The 2014 Gym Festival Trnava was a competition held in  Trnava, Slovakia from June 7–08.

Medal winners

Result

Junior Team Final

External links
  Result site

2014 in gymnastics